The 25th AVN Awards was an event during which Adult Video News (AVN) presented its annual AVN Awards to honor the best pornographic movies and adult entertainment products of 2007 in the United States.

The ceremony was held on January 12, 2008, at the Mandalay Bay Events Center, in Paradise, Nevada.

Ceremony

The 25th Anniversary Adult Video News awards made its broadcast premiere on Showtime on March 14. The two-hour presentation, billed as The AVN Adult Movie Awards, was taped on January 12 at the Mandalay Bay Events Center in Paradise, Nevada. For the first time the show was shot on High-Definition and was also broadcast in that format.

AVN announced nominations for its annual awards on November 26, 2007. Nominees in the 114 categories were selected by the AVN staff, and winners were selected by AVN writers and other adult film reviewers.

Leaders in nominations were Upload, a science-fiction thriller video from SexZ Pictures, with 22 nominations, and Layout, a film from Vivid Entertainment, with 18. This is the last year for separate film and video categories at the AVN awards.

Performer/director Belladonna received nine nominations, for Best Director (Non-Feature), Director of the Year and seven sex scenes. Performer/director Stormy Daniels received seven nominations, for acting, directing, screenplay, Director of the Year, Female Performer of the Year, Crossover Star of the Year, and Couples Sex Scene with veteran performer Randy Spears.

Spears himself received five nominations, including Best Actor (Video), Best Supporting Actor (Film) and Male Performer of the Year; performer Steven St. Croix received five, four for acting and one sex scene; performer/director Brad Armstrong received four, for acting, screenplay, and two for direction.

Wicked Pictures and its affiliated companies led the nominations count with 91, followed by Evil Angel Productions and its affiliates with 88, Vivid Entertainment and its affiliates with 84, Pure Play Media and its affiliates with 48, Digital Playground and its affiliates with 41, JM Productions and its affiliates with 39, Elegant Angel Productions with 33, Adam & Eve Pictures and its affiliates with 32 and Hustler Video and its affiliates with 31.

This year's additions to the AVN Hall of Fame are performers Brittany Andrews, Jay Ashley, Angel Kelly, Dyanna Lauren, Raylene, Ruby, Alexandra Silk, Angela Summers and Tasha Voux, performer/director Skye Blue, cameraman Jake Jacobs and director Michael Raven.

Changes in categories
The 25th annual AVN Awards was the last at which productions shot on film are divided into separate categories from those shot on video. This change comes due to the very few number of companies producing films.

AVN president Paul Fishbein stated, "If people make films, they'll be eligible in every category, and if there are enough of them, then we'll have a separate Best Film category."

The AVN Award categories that have until this year been divided up into film and video are: Best Actor, Best Actress, Best All-Girl Sex Scene, Best Anal Sex Scene, Best Art Direction, Best Cinematography/Videography, Best Couples Sex Scene, Best Director, Best Editing, Best Group Sex Scene, Best Oral Sex Scene, Best Screenplay, Best Supporting Actor and Best Supporting Actress.

Main awards
Winners of categories announced during the awards ceremony on January 12, 2008, are highlighted in boldface.

Other performing awards 

 Best Supporting Actor - Film: Randy Spears
 Best Supporting Actor - Video: Barrett Blade
 Best Supporting Actress - Film: Kylie Ireland
 Best Supporting Actress - Video: Hillary Scott
 Male Foreign Performer of the Year: David Perry
 Best Tease Performance: Brianna Love, Brianna Love: Her Fine Sexy Self
 Best Non-Sex Performance: Bryn Pryor, Upload

Best Scenes
Winners of categories announced during the awards ceremony on January 12, 2008, are highlighted in boldface.

Film

Video

 Best Three-way Sex Scene: Rocco Siffredi, Katsuni, Melissa Lauren, Fashionistas Safado: Berlin (Evil Angel)
 Best POV Sex Scene: Sunny Lane, Goo Girls 26 (Rodnievision/Exquisite)
 Best Sex Scene in a Foreign-Shot Production: Marsha Lord, Poppy Morgan, Joachim Kessef, Vanessa Hill, Sarah James, Kid Jamaica, Jazz Duro, Omar Galanti, Gianna, Kelly Stafford, Furious Fuckers: Final Race (Evil Angel)
 Best Solo Sex Scene: Eva Angelina, Upload (SexZ Pictures)

Best releases
The best releases of the year, selected by genre. The winners are shown in italics, followed by the production company.

 Video Feature: Upload (SexZ Pictures)
 All-Girl Release: Girlvana 3 (Zero Tolerance)
 All-Girl Series: Women Seeking Women (Girlfriends Films)
 All-Sex Release: G for Gianna (Evil Angel/Darkko Productions)
 Alternative Release: Buttman at Nudes a Poppin' 20 (Evil Angel
 Amateur Release: Cherries 56 (Homegrown Video/Pure Play Media)
 Amateur Series: Intimate Moments (abbywinters.com)
 Anal-Themed Series: Big Wet Asses (Elegant Angel)
 Animated Release: Night Shift Nurses (Adult Source Media)
 BDSM Release: Bondage Thoughts (Daring Media Group)
 Big Bust Release: Gina Lynn's DD's and Derrieres 2 (Gina Lynn Distribution)
 Big Bust Series: Big Natural Breasts (New Sensations)
 Continuing Video Series: Belladonna: Manhandled (Evil Angel/Belladonna)
 Ethnic-Themed Release - Asian: Anabolic Asians 5 (Anabolic Video)
 Ethnic-Themed Release - Black: Big Phat Black Wet Butts 7 (Evasive Angles)
 Ethnic-Themed Release - Latin: Big Latin Wet Butts 5 (Evasive Angles)
 Ethnic-Themed Series - Asian: Asian 1 on 1 (Naughty America/Pure Play Media)
 Ethnic-Themed Series - Black: Black Reign (Mercenary Pictures)
 Ethnic-Themed Series - Latin: Chicks & Salsa (Third Degree)
 Fem-Dom Strap-On Release: Babes Ballin' Boys 17 (Pleasure Productions)
 Foot Fetish Release: Stiletto (Pulse/Penthouse)
 Foreign All-Sex Release: Angel Perverse 8 (Evil Angel/Euro Angel)
 Foreign All-Sex Series: Ass Jazz (Evil Angel/Buttman Magazine Choice)
 Foreign Feature: Furious Fuckers: Final Race (Evil Angel/Rocco Siffredi)
 Gonzo Release: Brianna Love Is Buttwoman (Elegant Angel)
 Gonzo Series: Bang Bus (Bang Bros)
 High End All-Sex Release: Broken (Vivid)
 Internal Release: All Internal 5 (Jules Jordan/Cruel Media)
 Internal Series: 5 Guy Cream Pie (Kick Ass Pictures)
 Interracial Release: Black Owned 2 (Jules Jordan Video)
 Interracial Series: My Daughter's Fucking Blackzilla! (Hush Hush)
 MILF Release: It’s a Mommy Thing (Elegant Angel)
 MILF Series: Momma Knows Best (Red Light District)
 POV Release: Fucked on Sight 2 (Evil Angel/Manuel Ferrara)
 POV Series: Fucked on Sight (Evil Angel/Manuel Ferrara)
 Pro-Am Release: Breakin' 'Em In 11 (Vouyer Media)
 Pro-Am Series: Filthy's First Taste (Vivid/Club Jenna)
 Oral-Themed Release: Face Full of Diesel (Digital Sin)
 Oral-Themed Series: Feeding Frenzy (Jules Jordan Video)
 Sex Comedy: Operation Desert Stormy (Wicked)
 Vignette Release: Babysitters (Digital Playground)
 Vignette Series: Barely Legal School Girls (Hustler)
 Transsexual Release: Transsexual Babysitters 2 (Devil's Film)
 Transsexual Series: Transsexual Prostitutes (Devil's Film)
 Spanking Release: Baltimore Brat 2 (Kelly Payne Productions)
 Specialty Release, Other Genre: Cum On My Tattoo 3 (BurningAngel/Pulse)
 Specialty Series, Other Genre: Jack's Leg Show (Digital Playground)
 Squirting Release: Flower's Squirt Shower 4 (Elegant Angel)
 Squirting Series: Jada Fire Is Squirtwoman (Elegant Angel)
 Solo Release: Extreme Holly Goes Solo (Pink Visual Productions)
 Top Renting Title of the Year – 2007: Debbie Does Dallas ... Again, (Vivid)
 Top Selling Title of the Year – 2007: Pirates, (Adam & Eve/Digital Playground)

Honorary awards

Hall of Fame

 Brittany Andrews
 Jay Ashley
 Skye Blue
 Jake Jacobs
 Angel Kelly
 Dyanna Lauren

 Michael Raven
 Raylene
 Ruby
 Alexandra Silk
 Angela Summers
 Tasha Voux

Hall of Fame - Founders Branch
 Martin Rothstein, Model Distributors
 Teddy Rothstein, Star Distributors
 Kenneth Guarino, Metro Home Video

Reuben Sturman Awards
 Jeff Steward, JM Productions - Who battled Federal obscenity prosecution head-on and won.
 Rondee Kamins, General Video of America - For her appeals court victory striking down 2257 regulations as unconstitutional. Kamins warned that “freedom isn’t free” and that all 50 states have some kind of onerous restrictions on adult entertainment.

Technical awards 
The winners are shown in italics, followed by the production company.

 Best Art Direction - Film: The Craving (Wicked)
 Best Art Direction - Video: Fashionistas Safado: Berlin (Evil Angel)
 Best Cinematography: Fashion Underground (Vivid/Teravision)
 Best Classic DVD: Debbie Does Dallas (VCX)
 Best Director - Film: Paul Thomas, Layout (Vivid)
 Best Director - Foreign Release: Alessandro Del Mar, Dangerous Sex (Private USA/Pure Play Media)
 Best Director - Non-Feature: Belladonna, Belladonna: Manhandled 2 (Belladonna/Evil Angel)
 Best Director - Video: John Stagliano, Fashionistas Safado: Berlin (Evil Angel)
 Best DVD Extras: Upload (SexZ Pictures)
 Best DVD Menus: Not the Bradys XXX (Hustler/X-Play)
 Best Editing - Film: Andrew Blake, X (Studio A)
 Best Editing - Video:  John Stagliano, Fashionistas Safado: Berlin (Evil Angel)
 Best High-Definition Production: Fashionistas Safado: Berlin (Evil Angel)
 Best Interactive DVD: (tie) InTERActive (Teravision/Hustler) & Interactive Sex with Jenna Haze (Zero Toerance)
 Best Music: Afrodite Superstar (Femme Chocolat/Adam & Eve)
 Best New Video Production Company: Silver Sinema
 Best On-Line Marketing Campaign, Company Image: Club Jenna
 Best On-Line Marketing Campaign, Individual Project: Debbie Does Dallas ... Again (Vivid)
 Best Overall Marketing Campaign, Company Image: Vivid Entertainment
 Best Overall Marketing Campaign, Individual Project: Coming Home (Wicked)
 Best Packaging: Janine Loves Jenna [Double Disc] (Club Jenna)
 Best Packaging Innovation: The Exquisite Multimedia Lighted Boxes (Exquisite Multimedia)
 Best Retail Website, Rentals: SugarDVD
 Best Retail Website, Sales: AdultDVDEmpire.com
 Best Screenplay, Film: Layout, Phil Noir (Vivid)
 Best Screenplay, Video: Upload, Eli Cross (SexZ Pictures)
 Best Special Effects: Upload (SexZ Pictures)
 Best Videography: Black Worm (Pulpo)

See also

 Adult Video News Awards
 AVN Award for Male Performer of the Year
 AVN Female Performer of the Year Award 
 List of members of the AVN Hall of Fame
 AVN Award for Male Foreign Performer of the Year
 XBIZ Awards
 XRCO Awards

Notes

External links
 
2008 AVN Award nominees (archived at Wayback Machine, February 27, 2008)
 Adult Video News Awards  at the Internet Movie Database
 

AVN Awards
2007 film awards